George Washington Schuyler (February 2, 1810 – February 1, 1888) was an American businessman, author, politician and member of the prominent Schuyler family.

Early life
George Washington Schuyler was born on February 2, 1810, in Stillwater, New York, which is located in Saratoga County, New York.  His parents were Annatje (née Fort) Schuyler (1770–1851) and John Harmanus Schuyler (1763–1846), the private secretary of John Barker Church.  His siblings included: Henry Ten Broeck Schuyler, Phillip Church Schuyler, Catherine Angelica Schuyler (wife of Nicholas Bleecker), and Rebecca Sarah Margaret Schuyler.

His paternal grandparents were Harmanus Schuyler (a son of Nicholas Schuyler and Elsie (née Wendell) Schuyler) and Christina Ten Broeck (a daughter of Samuel Ten Broeck and Maria (née Van Rensselaer) Ten Broeck).

His family moved to Ithaca, N.Y., in 1811. There he worked on the family farm, and attended the public schools. At age sixteen, he began to work at a drugstore and learned this trade.  In 1834, he enrolled at New York University and graduated in 1837.

Career
After graduating from New York University in 1837, he returned to Ithaca, N.Y., and opened his own drugstore.

In 1848, he entered politics as a Free Soiler, and was trustee of the Village of Ithaca for two years. In 1855, he was among the founders of the Republican Party in Tompkins County. He was a delegate to the 1860 and 1864 Republican National Conventions.

He was elected New York State Treasurer in 1863, besting the incumbent William B. Lewis with 314,303 votes to Lewis' 284,618.  Schuyler, who was elected on the Union ticket nominated by the Republicans and War Democrats, served from 1864 to 1865.  He was appointed by Governor Reuben Fenton as the superintendent of the New York State Banking Department from 1866 to 1871.

New York State Assembly
In 1872, he joined the Liberal Republicans, and later became a Democrat.  He was a candidate against John H. Selkreg for the New York State Senate in 1873 and 1875, but was defeated both times.  In 1874, he was elected as a member of the New York State Assembly, representing Tompkins Co., in 98th New York State Legislature.

After serving in the Assembly, he was appointed by Governor Samuel J. Tilden as auditor of the Canal Department, a position he held for nearly five years.

Schuyler served as a trustee of Cornell University from its foundation, and treasurer from 1868 to 1874.  In 1885, he published Colonial New York: Philip Schuyler and His Family (Charles Scribner's Sons; 2 volumes), a valuable resource of Dutch origins, history and genealogy in the Albany region.

Personal life
Schuyler was married to Matilda Scribner (1809–1898), the daughter of Uriah Rogers Scribner and Martha Scribner. Matilda was a half-sister to Charles Scribner (1821–1871), the founder of Charles Scribner's Sons. Together, they were the parents of:

 Eugene Schuyler (1840–1890), a writer and diplomat.
 Martha Schuyler (1842–1922), who married Chauncey Lewis Grant, Jr. (1834–1887)
 Evelyn Schuyler (1846–1942), who married Charles Ashmead Schaeffer (1843–1898).
 Walter S. Schuyler (1850–1932), who married Mary Miller Gardiner, later Elizabeth Stanton. Career Army officer who retired as a brigadier general in 1913.
 Kate Bleecker Schuyler (1853–1859), who died young.

Schuyler died on February 1, 1888, in Ithaca.  After his death, his widow married Isaac Remsen Lane (d. 1910).

References
Notes

Sources
George W. Schuyler at Political Graveyard 
 Life Sketches of State Officers, Senators, and Members of Assembly in the State of New York in 1867 by S. R. Harlow and H. H. Boone (page 59; Weed, Parsons & Co., Albany NY, 1867)

External links
 

1810 births
1888 deaths
American people of Dutch descent
New York State Treasurers
Members of the New York State Assembly
New York University alumni
Schuyler family
People from Stillwater, New York
Politicians from Ithaca, New York
New York (state) Free Soilers
New York (state) Republicans
New York (state) Liberal Republicans
New York (state) Democrats
Cornell University people